Severian, Bishop of Gabala in Syria (* before 380; † after 408, but probably before 425), was a popular preacher in Constantinople from around 398/399 until 404. He became the enemy of John Chrysostom and helped condemn him at the Synod of the Oak.

Details of his life are scanty, and are preserved in Socrates Scholasticus and Sozomen. There is a brief life in Gennadius of Massilia. These tell us that he came to Constantinople around 398/399. He preached in a definite Syrian accent, and became a favourite of the empress Eudoxia. When, by the end of 401, the then archbishop John Chrysostom went to Asia, he charged Severian with the pastoral care of the church of Constantinople. But Severian was opposed and insulted by the deacon Sarapion, whom Chrysostom had delegated the economical affairs of the church.  When Chrysostom backed his own men, the two became enemies. Johannes Quasten described him as "full of hate" for Jews and heretics.

More than 50 of his sermons are extant. In Greek almost all of his homilies survive only among the works of his enemy Chrysostom. Several homilies, some of them lost in Greek, were translated into other languages (Latin, Coptic, Georgian, Armenian, Slavonic and Arabic, perhaps also in Syriac.) Eight of his sermons were published in Venice in 1827 from an ancient Armenian translation by J. B. Aucher: six of them are lost in Greek or known only from catena quotations.  Almost none have been edited critically, some have never been published, and the list is not certainly complete. Details of his works can be found in the Clavis Patrum Graecorum nos. 4185-4295.  One is edited by Migne in the Patrologia Graeca 65; many among the spuria attributed to John Chrysostom (Patrologia Graeca 48-63).

Severian belonged to the Antiochene school of exegesis, and his interpretations can be very literal. He is notorious for his six sermons on the Creation, in which he expresses "absurdly literal" views including support for the Flat Earth.

His Discourse on the Seals discusses the canon of the four Gospels.

His biblical commentaries also contributed to Greek catenas.

He is sometimes confused with Eusebius of Emesa in manuscripts, especially in Armenian.

Literature

 J. B. Aucher, Severiani sive Seberiani Gabalorum episcopi Emesensis Homiliae, Venice, 1827.  Sermons in Armenian translation.
 Remco F. Regtuit, Severian of Gabala, Homily on the Incarnation of Christ (CPG 4204). VU University Press, Amsterdam, 1992.
 Cyril Moss, Homily on the Nativity of Our Lord by Severian, Bishop of Gabala, Bulletin of the School of Oriental and African Studies, University of London, Vol. 12, No. 3/4, Oriental and African Studies Presented to Lionel David Barnett by His Colleagues, Past and Present (1948), pp. 555–566 - Syriac text and English translation of text found in British Library Ms. Oriental 8606 and Vatican Ms. Syr. 369, fol. 15v-17v.
 Johannes Zellinger, Die Genesishomilien des Bischofs Severian von Gabala. Aschendorff, 1916.
 Henry Wace, Dictionary of Christian Biography - article on Severian.
 Robert C. Hill and Carmen S. Hardin, Commentaries on Genesis 1-3, IVP (2010), .  English translation of Severian's Six sermons on Genesis, plus some sermons by Bede.
 Antoine Wenger,  Une homélie inédite de Sévérien de Gabala sur le lavement des pieds, Revue des études byzantines vol. 25 (1967), p. 219-234.

References

External links
 Severian of Gabala, Sermon on the Epiphany - English translation
 Severian of Gabala, Sermon on Peace - English translation
 Severian of Gabala, On Faith and the Natural Law - English translation
 Severian of Gabala, Sermon 1 on the Creation - English translation

4th-century Byzantine bishops
4th-century births
5th-century Byzantine bishops
5th-century deaths
5th-century Byzantine writers
Flat Earth proponents
Greek Christians